The 2011–12 Anaheim Ducks season was the 19th season of operation (18th season of play) for the National Hockey League franchise. Their first game of the season was held on October 7, 2011, against the Buffalo Sabres in Helsinki, Finland. The Ducks had a disappointing season compared to 2010–11, struggling in the first half of the season and digging a hole that was too deep to climb out of despite a second-half resurgence. 2011–12 marked the second playoff miss for the Ducks in three seasons. The Ducks ultimately finished the season in 13th place in the Western Conference with a 34–36–12 record.

Off-season
While the Anaheim Ducks entered the 2011 off-season with no major free agent challenges, the franchise did indeed have some question marks heading into the 2011–12 season. The biggest question on the ice was whether superstar Teemu Selanne would retire. The 40-year-old was incredibly successful in the 2010–11 season, averaging over a point per game, however, his age and length of his career (18 NHL seasons) was a factor. The Ducks' off-season started with the NHL Entry Draft, where Anaheim took Rickard Rakell in the first round (30th overall), John Gibson in the second round (39th overall) and traded for Andrew Cogliano from the Edmonton Oilers, subsequently signing him to a three-year contract. Head coach Randy Carlyle also signed a contract extension of three years after guiding the Ducks to their first Stanley Cup championship in 2007 and into the playoffs every season since he took the helm, save for the 2009–10 season. On the retirement front, the Ducks lost long-time, third-line center Todd Marchant to retirement on June 29, 2011, and on the same day, former Ducks captain Paul Kariya announced his retirement, quelling any rumors that he may return to the franchise he helped build. Other than a few transactions, the summer for Anaheim was relatively quiet, with most of the talk concerning the health of goaltender Jonas Hiller and whether Teemu Selanne will return for another season. Hiller was reported to be symptom-free as of August 19, and was expected to arrive at the Ducks' training camp on time in September. Selanne announced his return on September 15 after undergoing successful knee surgery early in the summer. 

Early in September, the 2011 Lokomotiv Yaroslavl plane crash rocked the hockey world when a plane carrying the Lokomotiv Yaroslavl team of the Kontinental Hockey League (KHL) crashed. The team featured multiple NHL prospects and former NHL stars, including former Mighty Duck Ruslan Salei. Salei had been a mainstay in the Anaheim organization for many years and a small memorial was erected in front of Honda Center by Ducks fans to remember him immediately after news of his passing became public.

Business and arena
On the business side, the Sacramento Kings of the National Basketball Association (NBA) expressed interest in moving to Honda Center, the Ducks' home arena. The team had until May 2, 2011, to file for relocation to play in Anaheim for the 2011–12 season. Ducks owners Henry and Susan Samueli have been trying to lure an NBA team to Honda Center since they purchased the team, mainly due to the prospective positive impact the team would have on the Ducks' finances and the finances of the Samueli family-owned Anaheim Arena Management. It was announced on May 2, however, that the Kings would remain in the city of Sacramento for at least one more season. Even though the Ducks remained the sole tenants of Honda Center at least through to the 2011–12 season, the Anaheim Ducks and Anaheim Arena Management announced that they would be doing a major upgrade to the arena in mid-June 2011. The upgrade is set to include the construction of a new restaurant, an expanded club area, a grand terrace, a new east entrance and a larger team merchandise store, with the cost of the project reportedly in the tens of millions of dollars. The Ducks also announced ticket prices for individual games would be reduced in order to take advantage of an "all-in" pricing mechanism.

Regular season
See the game log below for detailed game-by-game regular season information.

The 2011–12 Anaheim Ducks regular season schedule was released on June 23, 2011, and, as expected, the Ducks started their season as part of the NHL Premiere in Helsinki, Finland, on October 7. Their first home game was on October 14 against their in-state rivals, the San Jose Sharks. Anaheim's first actual road game was on October 17 against the Sharks at HP Pavilion. Their longest homestand was from December 29 to January 10 (six home games), and their longest road trip was from February 10 to 23 (eight road games). Their final game of the regular season was on April 7 at the Calgary Flames.

The Ducks struggled in the first half of the season, posting 18 points and a record of 6–20–6 over 32 games from October 21 to January 4, including a poor three-point, 1–8–1 stretch from November 5 to 27 that ultimately led to a coaching change.  Beginning on January 6, the team embarked on a turnaround, accumulating 38 points over a 24-game span and having one of the NHL's best records for games played from January through mid-February.  However, beginning on February 27, Anaheim proceeded to fall into another frustrating 5–8–1 ditch that ultimately would eliminate them from the playoff hunt. The Ducks were mathematically eliminated from playoff contention on March 28, at which point the Ducks only had 10 points up for grabs through the remainder of the season, and 11 points separated them from the last playoff spot. Anaheim's season ended on April 7 with a 5–2 loss to Calgary.  Starting goaltender Jonas Hiller finished 2011–12 with a 29–30–12 record and with a 2.57 goals against average (GAA).

October
October 7: The Ducks opened the season as part of the NHL Premiere in Ducks star Teemu Selanne's native Finland, losing 4–1 to Buffalo.
October 8: Second game of the premiere in Stockholm, Sweden, a 2–1 victory over the New York Rangers.
October 14: The Ducks home opener against rival San Jose; a 1–0 triumph. The Ducks previously opened against the Sharks during the 2009–10 season.
October 29: The Ducks faced the team that eliminated them in the 2011 Stanley Cup playoffs (Nashville) for the first time of the season at Bridgestone Arena and lost 3–0

November
November 16: The first game of the Freeway Face-Off series began against arch-rival Los Angeles at Staples Center; Anaheim lost 2–1.
November 25: For the fourth year in a row, the Ducks faced the Chicago Blackhawks at home on the day after Thanksgiving, losing 6–5.
November 30: After snapping their seven-game winless streak against the Montreal Canadiens, the Ducks organization relieved Head Coach Randy Carlyle of his duties and hired former Washington Capitals Head Coach Bruce Boudreau to replace him.

December
December 17: The Ducks visited the newly reincarnated Winnipeg Jets for the first time, losing 5–3. It was also current Ducks star and former Winnipeg Jets star Teemu Selanne's first regular season game in Winnipeg since he was traded to the Ducks in 1996.
December 29: The Ducks' longest homestand (six games) began.  The Ducks went 3–3–0 during this homestand.
December 31: Jean-Sebastien Giguere made his first visit to Honda Center since being traded from the Ducks as a member of the Colorado Avalanche, defeating his former team 4–2.

January
January 29: The 2012 All-Star Game took place in Ottawa, Ontario. (Team Chara defeated Team Alfredsson 12–9).

February
February 10: The Ducks' longest road trip (eight games) began.  The team went 5–1–2 over this trip.

March
March 25: The Ducks hosted the defending Stanley Cup champion Boston Bruins at Honda Center. The only meeting between the two teams during the 2011–12 season, goaltender Marty Turco led Boston to a 3–2 defeat of Anaheim.

April
April 7: The final game of the regular season took place against the Calgary Flames at the Scotiabank Saddledome, with the Ducks closing out the season with a 5–2 defeat.

Playoffs
The Ducks failed to qualify for the 2012 Stanley Cup playoffs.

Schedule and results

Pre-season
The 2011 Anaheim Ducks participated in seven pre-season games and one exhibition game against Jokerit before the 2011–12 regular season.

|-  style="text-align:center; background:#ffbbbb;"
| 1 || September 20 || Coyotes || 7–4 ||  || Visentin (1–0–0) || Gibson (0–1–0) || 12,544 || 0–1–0 || Honda Center || L1
|-  style="text-align:center; background:#ffbbbb;"
| 2 || September 21 || Sharks || 6–1 ||  ||  Greiss (1–0–0) || Deslauriers (0–1–0) || 13,494 || 0–2–0 || Honda Center || L2
|-  style="text-align:center; background:#ffbbbb;"
| 3 || September 23 || @ Sharks || 5–1 ||  || Greiss (2–0–0) || Ellis (0–1–0) || 16,541 || 0–3–0 || HP Pavilion at San Jose || L3
|-  style="text-align:center; background:#bbffbb;"
| 4 || September 24 || @ Canucks || 4–1 ||  || Hiller (1–0–0) || Schneider (0–1–0) || 18,860 || 1–3–0 || Rogers Arena || W1
|-  style="text-align:center; background:#bbffbb;"
| 5 || September 25 || @ Kings || 3–1 ||  || Deslauriers (1–1–0) || Quick (0–1–0) || 14,103 || 2–3–0 || Staples Center || W2
|-  style="text-align:center; background:#bbffbb;"
| 6 || September 28 || Canucks || 3–2 ||  || Hiller (2–0–0) || Luongo (0–1–0) || 13,542 || 3–3–0 || Honda Center || W3
|-  style="text-align:center; background:#ffbbbb;"
| 7 || September 30 || Kings || 3–1 || || Bernier (2–0–1) || Ellis (0–2–0) || 16,927 || 3–4–0 || Honda Center || L1
|-

|-  style="text-align:center; background:#bbffbb;"
| 8 || October 4 || @ Jokerit || 4–3 || OT || Hiller (3–0–0) || Tuohimaa (0–1–0) || 13,349 || 4–4–0 || Hartwall Areena (in Helsinki, FIN) || W1
|-

Regular season

|-  style="text-align:center; background:#ffbbbb;"
| 1 || October 7* || vs. Sabres || 4–1 ||  ||  Miller (1–0–0) || Hiller (0–1–0) || 13,349 || 0–1–0 || Hartwall Areena (in Helsinki) || L1 || style="background:#ffbbbb;"| 0
|-  style="text-align:center; background:#bbffbb;"
| 2 || October 8* || vs. Rangers || 2–1 || SO || Hiller (1–1–0) || Lundqvist (0–0–2) || 13,800 || 1–1–0 || Ericsson Globe (in Stockholm) || W1 || style="background:#bbcaff;"| 2
|-  style="text-align:center; background:#bbffbb;"
| 3 || October 14 || Sharks || 1–0 || || Hiller (2–1–0) || Greiss (1–1–0) || 17,243 || 2–1–0 || Honda Center || W2 || style="background:#bbcaff;"| 4
|-  style="text-align:center; background:#bbffbb;"
| 4 || October 16 || Blues || 4–2 || || Hiller (3–1–0) || Halak (1–3–0) || 14,555 || 3–1–0 || Honda Center || W3 || style="background:#bbcaff;"| 6
|-  style="text-align:center; background:#bbffbb;"
| 5 || October 17 || @ Sharks || 3–2 ||  || Ellis (1–0–0) || Niemi (0–1–0) || 17,562 || 4–1–0 || HP Pavilion at San Jose || W4 || style="background:#bbffbb;"| 8
|-  style="text-align:center; background:#ffbbbb;"
| 6 || October 21 || Stars || 3–1 ||  || Lehtonen (6–0–0) || Hiller (3–2–0) || 12,919 || 4–2–0 || Honda Center || L1 || style="background:#bbcaff;"| 8
|-  style="text-align:center; background:#ffbbbb;"
| 7 || October 23 || Coyotes || 5–4 ||  || Smith (2–2–1) || Hiller (3–3–0) || 13,240 || 4–3–0 || Honda Center || L2 || style="background:#bbcaff;"| 8  
|- style="text-align:center; bgcolor=#ffdddd"
| 8 || October 25 || @ Blackhawks || 3–2 || SO || Crawford (4–1–2) || Hiller (3–3–1) || 21,247 || 4–3–1 || United Center || O1 || style="background:#bbcaff;"| 9
|-  style="text-align:center; background:#bbffbb;"
| 9 || October 27 || @ Wild || 3–2 ||  || Hiller (4–3–1) || Backstrom (3–3–2) || 15,723 || 5–3–1 || Xcel Energy Center || W1 || style="background:#bbcaff;"| 11
|-  style="text-align:center; background:#ffbbbb;"
| 10 || October 29 || @ Predators || 3–0 ||  || Rinne (5–4–1) || Hiller (4–4–1) || 16,395 || 5–4–1 || Bridgestone Arena || L1 || 11
|-  style="text-align:center; background:#ffbbbb;"
| 11 || October 30 || @ Blue Jackets || 3–1 ||  || Mason (2–8–1) || Ellis (1–1–0) || 16,022 || 5–5–1 || Nationwide Arena || L2 || 11
|-
| colspan=12 style="text-align:left;"|*The Sabres were designated the home team on October 7 in Helsinki and the Ducks were designated the home team on October 8 in Stockholm.
|-

|-  style="text-align:center; background:#ffdddd;"
| 12 || November 1 || @ Capitals || 5–4 || OT || Vokoun (7–1–0) || Hiller (4–4–2) || 18,506 || 5–5–2 || Verizon Center || O1 || style="background:#ffbbbb;"| 12
|-  style="text-align:center; background:#ffdddd;"
| 13 || November 3 || @ Rangers || 2–1 || SO || Lundqvist (3–3–3) || Hiller (4–4–3) || 18,200 || 5–5–3 || Madison Square Garden || O2 || style="background:#ffbbbb;"| 13
|-  style="text-align:center; background:#ffbbbb;"
| 14 || November 5 || @ Red Wings || 5–0 ||  || Howard (5–3–1) || Hiller (4–5–3) || 20,066 || 5–6–3 || Joe Louis Arena || L1 || 13
|-  style="text-align:center; background:#ffbbbb;"
| 15 || November 9 || Predators || 4–2 ||  || Rinne (8–4–2) || Hiller (4–6–3) || 13,529 || 5–7–3 || Honda Center || L2 || 13
|-  style="text-align:center; background:#bbffbb"
| 16 || November 11 || Canucks || 4–3 ||  || Hiller (5–6–3) || Luongo (6–5–1) || 17,339 || 6–7–3 || Honda Center || W1 || style="background:#ffbbbb;" | 15 
|- style="text=align:center; background:#ffbbbb;"
| 17 || November 13 || Wild || 3–2 ||  || Backstrom (5–4–2) || Hiller (5–7–3) || 13,803 || 6–8–3 || Honda Center || L1 || 15
|- style="text=align:center; background:#ffdddd;"
| 18 || November 16 || @ Kings || 2–1 || SO || Quick (8–4–3) || Hiller (5–7–4) || 18,118 || 6–8–4 || Staples Center || O1 || style="background:#ffbbbb" | 16
|- style="text-align:center; background:#ffbbbb"
| 19 || November 17 || Kings || 5–3 ||  || Quick (9–4–3) || Ellis (1–2–0) || 15,412 || 6–9–4 || Honda Center || L1 || 16
|- style="text-align:center; background:#ffbbbb"
| 20 || November 20 || Red Wings || 4–2 ||  || Howard (10–5–1) || Hiller (5–8–4) || 17,229 || 6–10–4 || Honda Center || L2 || 16
|- style="text-align:center; background:#ffbbbb"
| 21 || November 23 || @ Coyotes || 4–2 ||  || Smith (10–3–3) || Hiller (5–9–4) || 9,124 || 6–11–4 || Jobing.com Arena || L3 || 16
|- style="text-align:center; background:#ffbbbb"
| 22 || November 25 || Blackhawks || 6–5 ||  || Crawford (10–6–2) || Ellis (1–3–0) || 17,174 || 6–12–4 || Honda Center || L4 || 16
|- style="text-align:center; background:#ffbbbb"
| 23 || November 27 || Maple Leafs || 5–2 ||  || Gustavsson (8–4–0) || Hiller (5–10–4) || 13,685 || 6–13–4 || Honda Center || L5 || 16
|- style="text-align:center; background:#bbffbb"
| 24 || November 30 || Canadiens || 4–1 ||  || Hiller (6–10–4) || Budaj (1–3–0) ||  13,237 || 7–13–4 || Honda Center || W1 || style="background:#ffbbbb;" | 18
|-

|- style="text-align:center; background:#ffdddd"
| 25 || December 2 || Flyers || 4–3 || OT || Bryzgalov (9–5–2) || Hiller (6–10–5) || 15,975 || 7–13–5 || Honda Center || O1 || style="background:#ffbbbb;" | 19
|- style="text-align:center; background:#FFBBBB"
| 26 || December 4 || Wild || 5–3 ||  || Harding (7–2–1) || Hiller (6–11–5) || 14,002 || 7–14–5 || Honda Center || L1 || 19
|- style="text-align:center; background:#BBFFBB"
| 27 || December 6 || Kings || 3–2 ||  || Hiller (7–11–5) || Quick (11–7–4) || 14,419 || 8–14–5 || Honda Center || W1 || style="background:#ffbbbb" | 21
|- style="text-align:center; background:#FFBBBB"
| 28 || December 8 || @ Blues || 4–2 ||  || Halak (5–7–3) || Hiller (7–12–5) || 18,596 || 8–15–5 || Scottrade Center || L1 || 21
|- style="text-align:center; background:#FFBBBB"
| 29 || December 10 || @ Predators || 3–2 ||  || Rinne (12–9–4) || Ellis (1–4–0) || 17,113 || 8–16–5 || Bridgestone Arena || L2 || 21
|-  style="text-align:center; background:#bbffbb"
| 30 || December 14 || Coyotes || 4–1 ||  || Hiller (8–12–5) || Smith (13–9–3) || 13,428 || 9–16–5 || Honda Center || W1 || style="background:#ffbbbb;"| 23
|- style="text-align:center; background:#ffbbbb"
| 31 || December 16 || @ Blackhawks || 4–1 ||  || Emery (8–1–2) || Hiller (8–13–5) || 21,528 || 9–17–5 || United Center || L1 || 23
|- style="text-align:center; background:#ffbbbb"
| 32 || December 17 || @ Jets || 5–3 ||  || Mason (4–2–0) || Ellis (1–5–0) || 15,004 || 9–18–5 || MTS Centre || L2 || 23
|- style="text-align:center; background:#ffbbbb"
| 33 || December 19 || @ Stars || 5–3 ||  || Bachman (4–1–0) || Hiller (8–14–5) || 13,720 || 9–19–5 || American Airlines Center || L3 || 23
|- style="text-align:center; background:#ffdddd"
| 34 || December 22 || @ Kings || 3–2 || SO || Quick (14–10–4) || Hiller (8–14–6) || 18,118 || 9–19–6 || Staples Center || O1 || style="background:#ffbbbb;" | 24
|- style="text-align:center; background:#bbffbb"
| 35 || December 26 || @ Sharks || 3–2 ||  || Hiller (9–14–6) || Niemi (15–7–3) || 17,562 || 10–19–6 || HP Pavilion || W1 || style="background:#ffbbbb;" | 26
|- style="text-align:center; background:#ffbbbb"
| 36 || December 29 || Canucks || 5–2 ||  || Schneider (8–5–0) || Hiller (9–15–6) || 17,544 || 10–20–6 || Honda Center || L1 || 26
|- style="text-align:center; background:#ffbbbb"
| 37 || December 31 || Avalanche || 4–2 ||  || Giguere (9–5–0) || Hiller (9–16–6) || 15,119 || 10–21–6 || Honda Center || L2 || 26
|-

|- style="text-align:center; background:#ffbbbb"
| 38 || January 4 || Sharks || 3–1 ||  || Niemi (17–7–4) || Hiller (9–17–6) || 14,596 || 10–22–6 || Honda Center || L3 || 26
|- style="text-align:center; background:#bbffbb"
| 39 || January 6 || Islanders || 4–2 ||  || Hiller (10–17–6) || Nabokov (5–9–0) || 13,892 || 11–22–6 || Honda Center || W1 || style="background:#ffbbbb;" | 28
|- style="text-align:center; background:#bbffbb"
| 40 || January 8 || Blue Jackets || 7–4 ||  || Tarkki (1–0–0) || Sanford (6–8–3) || 13,053 || 12–22–6 || Honda Center || W2 || style="background:#ffbbbb;" | 30
|- style="text-align:center; background:#bbffbb"
| 41 || January 10 || Stars || 5–2 ||  || Deslauriers (1–0–0) || Lehtonen (15–7–1) || 12,152 || 13–22–6 || Honda Center || W3 || style="background:#ffbbbb;" | 32
|- style="text-align:center; background:#ffdddd"
| 42 || January 12 || @ Flames || 1–0 || OT || Kiprusoff (20–14–2) || Hiller (10–17–7) || 19,289 || 13–22–7 || Scotiabank Saddledome || O1 || style="background:#ffbbbb;" | 33
|- style="text-align:center; background:#bbffbb"
| 43 || January 13 || @ Oilers || 5–0 ||  || Hiller (11–17–7) || Khabibulin (11–13–4) ||  16,839 || 14–22–7 || Rexall Place || W1 || style="background:#ffbbbb;" | 35
|- style="text-align:center; background:#bbffbb"
| 44 || January 15 || @ Canucks || 4–2 ||  || Hiller (12–17–7) || Luongo (18–10–3) || 18,890 || 15–22–7 || Rogers Arena || W2 || style="background:#ffbbbb;" | 37
|-  style="text-align:center; background:#bbffbb"
| 45 || January 18 || Coyotes || 6–2 ||  || Hiller (13–17–7) || Smith (17–12–6) || 12,281 || 16–22–7 || Honda Center || W3 || style="background:#ffbbbb;" | 39
|-  style="text-align:center; background:#bbffbb"
| 46 || January 21 || Senators || 2–1 ||  || Hiller (14–17–7) || Anderson (25–13–4) || 15,500 || 17–22–7 || Honda Center || W4 || style="background:#ffbbbb;" | 41
|-  style="text-align:center; background:#bbffbb"
| 47 || January 22 || Avalanche || 3–2 ||  || Hiller (15–17–7) || Giguere (12–7–0) || 14,004 || 18–22–7 || Honda Center || W5 || style="background:#ffbbbb;" | 43
|-  style="text-align:center; background:#ffbbbb"
| 48 || January 24 || @ Stars || 1–0 ||  || Lehtonen (17–11–1) || Hiller (15–18–7) || 12,141 || 18–23–7 || American Airlines Center || L1 || 43
|- align="center" bgcolor="#bbcaff" 
| colspan="3" | Jan. 29: All-Star Game (Chara wins—box) || 12–9 ||  || Thomas (BOS) || Elliott (STL) || 20,510 ||  || Scotiabank Place || colspan="2" | Ottawa, ON
|-  style="text-align:center; background:#bbffbb"
| 49 || January 31 || @ Coyotes || 4–1 ||  || Hiller (16–18–7) || Smith (18–14–7) || 10,579 || 19–23–7 || Jobing.com Arena || W1 || style="background:#ffbbbb;" | 45
|-

|- style="text-align:center; background:#ffbbbb"
| 50 || February 1 || Stars || 6–2 ||  || Lehtonen (18–11–1) || Hiller (16–19–7) || 12,701 || 19–24–7 || Honda Center || L1 || 45
|- style="text-align:center; background:#ffdddd"
| 51 || February 3 || Blue Jackets || 3–2 || OT || Sanford (9–12–4) || Hiller (16–19–8) || 13,358 || 19–24–8 || Honda Center || O1 || style="background:#ffbbbb;" | 46
|- style="text-align:center; background:#bbffbb"
| 52 || February 6 || Flames || 3–2 || SO || Hiller (17–19–8) || Kiprusoff (23–17–4) || 12,096 || 20–24–8 || Honda Center || W1 || style="background:#ffbbbb;" | 48
|-  style="text-align:center; background:#bbffbb"
| 53 || February 8 || Hurricanes || 3–2 || OT || Hiller (18–19–8) || Ward (20–18–9) || 12,675 || 21–24–8 || Honda Center || W2 || style="background:#ffbbbb;" | 50
|- style="text-align:center; background:#ffdddd"
| 54 || February 10 || @ Red Wings || 2–1 || SO || MacDonald (2–1–1) || Hiller (18–19–9) || 20,066 || 21–24–9 || Joe Louis Arena || O1 || style="background:#ffbbbb;" | 51
|- style="text-align:center; background:#bbffbb"
| 55 || February 12 || @ Blue Jackets || 5–3 ||  || Hiller (19–19–9) || Mason (6–20–2) || 14,033 || 22–24–9 || Nationwide Arena || W1 || style="background:#ffbbbb;" | 53
|- style="text-align:center; background:#bbffbb"
| 56 || February 14 || @ Wild || 2–1 ||  || Hiller (20–19–9) || Harding (9–8–3) || 17,552 || 23–24–9 || Xcel Energy Center || W2 || style="background:#ffbbbb;" | 55
|- style="text-align:center; background:#bbffbb"
| 57 || February 15 || @ Penguins || 2–1 ||  || Hiller (21–19–9) || Fleury (29–14–3) || 18,482 || 24–24–9 || Consol Energy Center || W3 || style="background:#ffbbbb;" | 57
|- style="text-align:center; background:#ffdddd"
| 58 || February 17 || @ Devils || 3–2 || SO || Brodeur (20–13–2) || Hiller (21–19–10) || 15,312 || 24–24–10 || Prudential Center || O1 || style="background:#ffbbbb;" | 58
|- style="text-align:center; background:#bbffbb"
| 59 || February 19 || @ Panthers || 2–0 ||  || Hiller (22–19–10) || Theodore (15–11–5) || 15,945 || 25–24–10 || BankAtlantic Center || W1 || style="background:#ffbbbb;" | 60
|- style="text-align:center; background:#ffbbbb"
| 60 || February 21 || @ Lightning || 3–2 ||  || Garon (19–15–4) || Hiller (22–20–10) || 18,309 || 25–25–10 || Tampa Bay Times Forum || L1 || 60
|- style="text-align:center; background:#bbffbb"
| 61 || February 23 || @ Hurricanes || 3–2 || SO || Hiller (23–20–10) || Peters (2–3–1) || 16,564 || 26–25–10 || RBC Center || W1 || style="background:#ffbbbb;" | 62
|-  style="text-align:center; background:#bbffbb"
| 62 || February 26 || Blackhawks || 3–1 ||  || Hiller (24–20–10) || Emery (11–8–2) || 17,601 || 27–25–10 || Honda Center || W2 || style="background:#ffbbbb;" | 64
|- style="text-align:center; background:#ffbbbb"
| 63 || February 27 || @Avalanche || 4–1 ||  || Varlamov (18–18–2) || Hiller (24–21–10) || 15,133 || 27–26–10 || Pepsi Center || L1 || 64
|-  style="text-align:center; background:#ffbbbb"
| 64 || February 29 || Sabres || 2–0 ||  || Miller (20–17–5) || Hiller (24–22–10) || 14,972 || 27–27–10 || Honda Center || L2 || 64
|-

|- style="text-align:center; background:#bbffbb"
| 65 || March 2 || Flames || 3–2 ||  || Hiller (25–22–10) || Irving (1–2–3) || 16,431 || 28–27–10 || Honda Center || W1 || style="background:#ffbbbb;" | 66
|- style="text-align:center; background:#ffbbbb"
| 66 || March 3 || @Kings || 4–2 || || Quick (26–18–11) || Hiller (25–23–10) || 18,301 || 28–28–10 || Staples Center || L1 || 66
|- style="text-align:center; background:#bbffbb"
| 67 || March 5 || Oilers || 4–2 ||  || Hiller (26–23–10) || Khabibulin (12–18–5) || 13,596 || 29–28–10 || Honda Center || W1 || style="background:#ffbbbb;" | 68
|- style="text-align:center; background:#ffbbbb"
| 68 || March 8 || @Blues || 3–1 || || Halak (23–10–5) || Hiller (26–24–10) || 19,150 || 29–29–10 || Scottrade Center || L1 || 68
|- style="text-align:center; background:#ffbbbb"
| 69 || March 10 || @Stars || 2–0 || || Lehtonen (28–15–4) || Hiller (26–25–10) || 18,228 || 29–30–10 || American Airlines Center || L2 || 68
|- style="text-align:center; background:#ffdddd"
| 70 || March 12 || @Avalanche || 3–2 || OT || Varlamov (22–20–2) || Hiller (26–25–11) || 15,045 || 29–30–11 || Pepsi Center || O1 || style="background:#ffbbbb;" | 69
|- style="text-align:center; background:#bbffbb"
| 71 || March 14 || Red Wings || 4–0 ||  || Hiller (27–25–11) || MacDonald (8–5–1) || 16,331 || 30–30–11 || Honda Center || W1 || style="background:#ffbbbb;" | 71
|- style="text-align:center; background:#ffbbbb"
| 72 || March 16 || Kings || 4–2 ||  || Quick (30–19–11) || Hiller (27–26–11) || 17,367 || 30–31–11 || Honda Center || L1 || 71
|- style="text-align:center; background:#ffbbbb"
| 73 || March 18 || Predators || 3–1 ||  || Lindback (3–7–0) || Hiller (27–27–11) || 14,978 || 30–32–11 || Honda Center || L2 || 71
|- style="text-align:center; background:#bbffbb"
| 74 || March 19 || @Sharks || 5–3 ||  || Deslauriers (2–0–0) || Niemi (28–19–9) || 17,562 || 31–32–11 || HP Pavilion || W1 || style="background:#ffbbbb;" | 73
|- style="text-align:center; background:#bbffbb"
| 75 || March 21 || Blues || 4–3 ||  || Hiller (28–27–11) || Halak (25–11–6) || 14,494 || 32–32–11 || Honda Center || W2 || style="background:#ffbbbb;" | 75
|- style="text-align:center; background:#ffbbbb"
| 76 || March 25 || Bruins || 3–2 ||  || Turco (1–1–0) || Hiller (28–28–11) || 17,395 || 32–33–11 || Honda Center || L1 || 75
|- style="text-align:center; background:#bbffbb"
| style="background:#780000;color:white;"| 77 || style="background:#780000;color:white;"| March 28* || Sharks ||  style="background:#bbffbb;" | 3–1 ||  || Hiller (29–28–11) || Niemi (31–21–9) || 14,780 || 33–33–11 || Honda Center || W1 || style="background:#780000;" | 77
|- style="text-align:center; background:#ffbbbb"
| 78 || March 31 || @Coyotes || 4–0 ||  || Smith (35–18–10) || Deslauriers (2–1–0) || 15,856 || 33–34–11 || Jobing.com Arena || L1 || 77
|-
| colspan=12 style="text-align:left" | * Despite the fact that Anaheim defeated San Jose in a 3–1 decision, the Ducks were mathematically eliminated from playoff contention on March 28 due to Dallas and Los Angeles wins earlier in the evening.
|-

|- style="text-align:center; background:#ffbbbb"
| 79 || April 1 || Oilers || 2–1 ||  || Dubnyk (20–18–2) || Hiller (29–29–11) || 17,266 || 33–35–11 || Honda Center || L1 || 77
|- style="text-align:center; background:#ffdddd"
| 80 || April 3 || @Canucks || 5–4 || SO || Schneider (20–7–1) || Hiller (29–29–12) || 18,890 || 33–35–12 || Rogers Arena || O1 || style="background:#ffbbbb;" | 78
|- style="text-align:center; background:#bbffbb"
| 81 || April 5 || @Oilers || 3–2 || OT || Deslauriers (3–1–0) || Dubnyk (20–19–3) || 16,839 || 34–35–12 || Rexall Place || W1 || style="background:#ffbbbb;" | 80
|- style="text-align:center; background:#ffbbbb"
| 82 || April 7 || @Flames || 5–2 ||  || Karlsson (1–4–2) || Hiller (29–30–12) || 19,289 || 34–36–12 || Scotiabank Saddledome || L1 || style="background:#ffbbbb;" | 80
|-

Standings

Player statistics

Skaters
Note: GP = Games played; G = Goals; A = Assists; Pts = Points; +/− = Plus/minus; PIM = Penalty minutes

Goaltenders
Note: GP = Games played; GS = Games started; TOI = Time on ice (minutes); W = Wins; L = Losses; OT = Overtime losses; GA = Goals against; GAA= Goals against average; SA= Shots against; SV= Saves; Sv% = Save percentage; SO= Shutouts

†Denotes player spent time with another team before joining Ducks. Stats reflect time with Ducks only.
‡Traded mid-season. 
Bold/italics denotes franchise record

Awards and records

Awards

Records

Milestones

Transactions
The Ducks have been involved in the following transactions during the 2011–12 season.

Trades

|}

Free agents signed

Free agents lost

Claimed via waivers

Lost via waivers

Lost via retirement

Players signings

Draft picks 
The Ducks' picks at the 2011 NHL Entry Draft in St. Paul, Minnesota:

See also 
 Anaheim Ducks
 Honda Center
 2011–12 NHL season

Other Anaheim–based teams in 2011–12
Los Angeles Angels of Anaheim (Angel Stadium of Anaheim)
 2011 Los Angeles Angels of Anaheim season
 2012 Los Angeles Angels of Anaheim season

References

Anaheim Ducks seasons
Anaheim Ducks season, 2011-12
Anaheim Ducks
Mighty Ducks of Anaheim
Mighty Ducks of Anaheim